Diwan is a coastal locality in the Shire of Douglas, Queensland, Australia.

Geography 
The locality is partly bounded by Cape Tribulation Road to the north, by Alexandra Bay (within the Coral Sea) to the east, and by Hutchinson Creek to the south.

Most of Diwan is within the Daintree National Park.

History 
Alexandra Bay State School opened on 1 June 1986.

The locality was named and bounded on 8 September 2000.

Education 
Alexandra Bay State School is a government primary (Early Childhood-6) school for boys and girls at Lot 1 Cape Tribulation Road. In 2017, the school had an enrolment of 31 students with 3 teachers and 6 non-teaching staff (3 full-time equivalent).

References

External links

Shire of Douglas
Localities in Queensland